John Lonsdale (1788–1867) was a British bishop.

John Lonsdale may also refer to:

John Lonsdale, 1st Baron Armaghdale (1850–1924), British businessman and politician
John Lowther, 1st Viscount Lonsdale (1655–1700), English politician
John Lonsdale (historian), Emeritus Professor, University of Cambridge and Africanist
John Lonsdale, Australian senior public servant and Chair of APRA